Intense Tropical Cyclone Hondo was the strongest and longest lived tropical cyclone to develop during the 2007–08 South-West Indian Ocean cyclone season. The disturbance quickly strengthened, becoming a moderate tropical storm on February 4 and a severe tropical storm the following day. After a brief period of slower intensification, Hondo rapidly intensified into an intense tropical cyclone and reached its peak intensity with winds of  10-minute winds) on February 7. The cyclone gradually weakened over the next several days due to an increase in forward speed and a decrease in sea surface temperatures. On February 12, Hondo rapidly degenerated into a remnant-low-pressure area. Over the following week, the remnant low traveled in a general west-northwest direction with no development. The next day, advisories were issued on Tropical Disturbance Ex-Hondo, which briefly strengthened into a tropical depression. However, according to the Joint Typhoon Warning Center, Hondo continued to strengthen and attained winds of  1-minute winds) before passing directly over Réunion. Interaction with the island caused the storm to weaken and degenerate into a remnant low once more. The storm dissipated on February 29 after executing a counterclockwise loop.

Meteorological history

On February 2, the Regional Specialized Meteorological Centre for the southwest Indian Ocean, Météo-France, and the Joint Typhoon Warning Center (JTWC) began monitoring a tropical disturbance located in the western portion of Météo-France's area of responsibility. However, it was not operationally classified as a disturbance for another two days. Traveling generally towards the southwest, the disturbance slowly strengthened. At 0300 UTC on February 4, the JTWC issued a Tropical Cyclone Formation Alert for the system as deep convection and outer bands developed around the center. A buoy located just to the south of the small circulation recording decreasing atmospheric pressure, having lowered by 4 hPa (mbar) in the past 24 hours.

With weak steering currents provided by an area of high pressure to the north, the disturbance slowly moved towards the east-southeast. At 1500 UTC, the JTWC began issuing advisories on the disturbance which they designated as Tropical Cyclone 16S. With high oceanic heat content, low wind shear, and good divergence aloft, significant strengthening was likely. Early the next day, Météo-France upgraded the disturbance to a tropical depression as winds increased to  10-minute winds). However, in the post-season analysis, Météo-France determined that the system had become a depression about 12 hours earlier and was already a moderate tropical storm by the time of the operation upgrade. At 0600 UTC, Météo-France classified the depression as a moderate tropical storm and was given the name Hondo; a name submitted to the World Meteorological Organization by Zimbabwe. It was later determined that Hondo was already a severe tropical storm by the time it was named operationally.

Hondo continued to quickly strengthen, becoming a tropical cyclone, the equivalent of a Category 1 hurricane on the Saffir–Simpson scale, that same day. After maintaining its through the early hours of February 6, a pinhole eye began to develop, signifying that Hondo was beginning to undergo rapid intensification. During this intensification phase, the storm became nearly stationary again due to a weakness in the ridge which was previously steering the cyclone towards the east. Later that day, Hondo was upgraded to an intense tropical cyclone with winds of  10-minute winds). After becoming an intense tropical cyclone, wind shear began to increase, causing the eye to become slightly disorganized, temporarily slowed the intensification. Later in the day, the eye became better defined, allowing Hondo to intensify further. Operationally, Hondo was upgraded to a very intense tropical cyclone with winds of  10-minute winds) with a minimum pressure of 906 hPa (mbar). However, after reanalysis, it was found that Hondo never intensified beyond intense tropical cyclone status and winds peaked at  10-minute winds) with a minimum pressure of 915 hPa (mbar).

Around the same time that Météo-France assessed Hondo to have peaked, the JTWC reported that the storm had attained winds of  1-minute winds), equivalent to a strong Category 4 hurricane. Shortly after reaching peak intensity, the cloud tops around the eye began to warm, meaning that the storm was beginning to weaken. Hondo also turned towards the southwest and kept a steady pace as two subtropical highs began influencing its movement. The storm continued to weaken as cloud tops warmed but remained an intense tropical cyclone as its eye was still well-defined. Hondo briefly re-intensified later on February 8 despite the structure of the storm deteriorating. The cyclone maintained intense tropical cyclone status through February 10 due to the formation of a large eye which helped maintain the storms structure. Hondo gradually began to weaken due to a combination of decreasing sea surface temperatures and increasing forward motion. On February 10, Hondo started a gradual curving path due to a trough located to the south and strengthening high-pressure systems to the north.

Continued weakened led to the storm being downgraded to a severe tropical storm early on February 11 as it tracked towards the southeast. After spending several hours over cold waters, most of the convection associated with Hondo dissipated due to the lack of energy and the storm was further downgraded to a moderate tropical storm. Later that day, no convection remained around the storm as it weakened to a tropical depression. The JTWC issued their final advisory on February 12 as the storm showed no signs of convective activity. Hondo degenerated into a remnant-low-pressure area as Météo-France issued their final advisory at 1200 UTC. For the next week, the remnant low traveled in a general west-northwestward direction with little or no development.

On February 21, Météo-France began to issue advisories on Tropical Disturbance Ex-Hondo which presented a well-defined circulation. Later that day, deep convection redeveloped around the center as the low entered an area favorable for development. At 0830 UTC, the JTWC issued a Tropical Cyclone Formation Alert, stating that Hondo was likely to regenerate into a tropical cyclone. Later that day, Hondo became almost stationary and was upgraded to a tropical depression as it continued to develop. The next day, Hondo was downgraded to a tropical disturbance as wind shear constrained convective development and caused the system to weaken. However, early on February 23, the JTWC began issuing advisories on Hondo as they estimated winds to have reached  once more. At 0600 UTC, Hondo attained winds of  1-minute winds) near Mauritius and Réunion. Due to the proximity to the islands, convection associated with the storm became disorganized and it began to weaken. The JTWC issued their final advisory early on February 24 as the system significantly weakened, with the center devoid of convection. Météo-France issued their final advisory several hours later. The remnants of Hondo persisted for another five days, executing a counterclockwise loop before dissipating on February 29.

Preparations and impact
As Hondo began to regenerate, Mauritius and Réunion were placed under a state of alert. Residents in Réunion were advised to stay up to date with the latest warnings on the storm, not go hiking in the mountains, ensure their disaster kit is fully stocked, stay away from the shore, and know the locations of the nearest shelters. Initially, residents in Madagascar feared that Hondo would make landfall in the country after being struck by Cyclone Ivan on February 16. However, the storm turn towards the southwest, away from Madagascar. On February 23 ex-Hondo tracked just offshore Mauritius before passing directly over Réunion, just short of moderate tropical storm status. Up to 760,000 people were affected on Réunion and overall damage was minimal.

See also

Tropical cyclones in the Mascarene Islands

References

External links
 Joint Typhoon Warning Center (JTWC) 
 Météo France (RSMC La Réunion)

2007–08 South-West Indian Ocean cyclone season
Tropical cyclones in the Mascarene Islands
Intense Tropical Cyclones
Tropical cyclones in 2008